VGTM Urban Development Authority (abbreviated:VGTM–UDA) (also known as Vijayawada Guntur Tenali Mangalagiri Urban Development Authority) is an urban planning agency in the Indian state of Andhra Pradesh. It was formed in the year 1978 and covers Vijayawada, Guntur, Tenali, Mangalagiri and its surrounding areas.

Jurisdiction 

The region constitute thirteen urban local bodies, three municipal corporations (Vijayawada, Guntur, Mangalgiri&Tadepalli) and eight municipalities (Gudivada, Nuzvid, Jaggayyapet, Tenali, Sattenapalli, Ponnuru, TSRTadigadapa, Kondapalli) and two Nagar panchayats (nandiagam, Vuyyuru).

Defunct 

It was dissolved to form a new authority in the name of Andhra Pradesh Capital Region Development Authority.

References 

Urban development authorities of Andhra Pradesh
Government of Vijayawada
Government of Guntur
Government of Tenali
Mangalagiri
2014 disestablishments in India
1978 establishments in Andhra Pradesh
Buildings and structures in Vijayawada
Organisations based in Vijayawada